Heike Henkel (born Heike Redetzky on 5 May 1964) is a German former athlete competing in high jump. She was Olympic, World and European champion. She won the high jump gold medal at the 1992 Summer Olympics in Barcelona.

Biography
Henkel was born in Kiel, Schleswig-Holstein. Having competed for West Germany at the Olympic Games in 1984 and 1988, she emerged as the world's leading female high jumper of the early 1990s. As well as her Olympic triumph, Henkel won World, World Indoor, European and European Indoor titles. She is one of only three female high jumpers in history (until August, 2021) to have won all five titles, the other two being Stefka Kostadinova and Mariya Lasitskene.  She was also very successful at the Hochsprung mit Musik meeting, taking the title three times consecutively from 1991 to 1993 and securing a record fourth win in 1995.

From 1989 to 2001, she was married to swimmer Rainer Henkel. On 30 April 2004 she married decathlete Paul Meier.

Competition record

Note: Henkel was forced to withdraw from the 1993 World Championship final due to injury, having cleared 1.90 m in the qualifying round.

See also
Female two metres club

External links
 
 
 
 Leverkusen who's who

1964 births
Living people
German female high jumpers
Sportspeople from Kiel
Sportspeople from Schleswig-Holstein
Athletes (track and field) at the 1984 Summer Olympics
Athletes (track and field) at the 1988 Summer Olympics
Athletes (track and field) at the 1992 Summer Olympics
Olympic athletes of Germany
Olympic athletes of West Germany
Olympic gold medalists for Germany
World Athletics Championships medalists
European Athletics Championships medalists
Medalists at the 1992 Summer Olympics
Olympic gold medalists in athletics (track and field)
Track & Field News Athlete of the Year winners
IAAF World Athlete of the Year
World Athletics Indoor Championships medalists
World Athletics Indoor Championships winners
World Athletics Championships winners